Arnold Aldea Clavio (born November 2, 1965), also known as Igan, is a Filipino radio and television newscaster, journalist, and television host. He currently co-anchors GMA Network's late-night newscast Saksi, the morning show Unang Hirit, and a morning radio show called One on One: Walang Personalan on DZBB with Connie Sison. He also writes a column entitled Hirit Na! for the tabloid newspaper Abante. He was the director of Solid Ground School in Plaridel, Bulacan in 1998.

Biography
Whilst in school, Clavio was a member of his school newspaper's editorial staff. He earned his Bachelor of Arts degree in Journalism at the University of Santo Tomas Faculty of Arts and Letters.

After graduating, Clavio worked as a news writer at DWIZ. After a year, he became a field reporter for GMA Network's flagship radio station, DZBB.

Clavio made his first appearance as a television news reporter in 1994, when GMA offered him a reporter's slot in Brigada Siete, co-hosting with the late Louie Beltran and Jessica Soho.
The next year, the Philippine Department of Health awarded Clavio top prize in their Philippine AIDS-STD Media Awards for his report on Sarah Jane Salazar. Later that year, the Asian Broadcasting Union named Clavio's coverage of Abu Sayyaf the "Best Reportage of a Crisis."

In 1996, Clavio became the host of Emergency, a late-night news and public affairs program, replacing Edu Manzano. In 1999, he began to co-host Unang Hirit, an early morning news and lifestyle program.

Three years later, Clavio was hosting his morning radio program, Dobol A sa Dobol B. The program was named 1999's "Best Public Affairs Program" on radio by the KBP Golden Dove Awards.

On March 15, 2004, he replaced Mike Enriquez as co-anchor of Saksi. In November of that year, he co-hosted the Eat Bulaga Silver Special, a collaboration between TAPE Productions and GMA News and Public Affairs, with his co-host from Unang Hirit, Rhea Santos.

In 2009 and 2010, Clavio hosted a variety of television programs.  In March 2009, he co-hosted Case Unclosed, replacing Kara David.  In September of that year, he was a guest newscaster for 24 Oras: Special Edition, a special weekend newscast that aired after Typhoon Ondoy, Typhoon Pepeng, and the Maguindanao massacre. He also appeared in 24 Oras as a substitute anchor for Mike Enriquez during his medical leave.

In March 2010, Clavio became the host of Kandidato, a public affairs talk show featuring interviews with presidential candidates.  The next month, the primetime talk show Tonight with Arnold Clavio was launched on the Q channel and GMA News TV.  Clavio also hosted a new public service program called Rescue a month later.

In February 2011, he became a solo newscaster on Balita Pilipinas.

In March 2012, he was named as one of the 18 awardees at the 2nd UST AB Gantimpala Awards held at Club Filipino in Greenhills. In December 2012, Clavio was inducted to the Eastwood City Walk of Fame for his work as a newscaster.

Controversies
On March 15, 2012, the Philippine Football Federation lodged a formal complaint with the GMA Network regarding allegedly "racist, discriminatory, libelous and malicious statements made by Clavio."

In May 2013, after TV host Vice Ganda made a "rape joke" in reference to Clavio's fellow anchor Jessica Soho, Clavio came out in defense of Soho, expressing his disapproval of Vice's remarks.

On November 6, 2013, Clavio came under fire for an interview conducted with attorney Alfredo Villamor on the morning talk show Unang Hirit. Villamor was standing in for Janet Napoles to discuss the "Pork Barrel scandal."

In August 2020, former OFW Sarah Balabagan, who is now a host of a Las Vegas-based radio program, claimed in a Facebook livestream that Clavio was the father of her eldest child, and that their relationship happened when she was still 17 years old. The revelation also sparked criticism on social media, with one Twitter user calling him "a pedophile". Balabagan had clarified in her livestream that the revelation was not out of revenge, but to merely put rumors to rest. She also added that she apologized to "everyone she hurt", including her family and Clavio's family, and that Clavio's wife forgave her through Facebook Messenger.

On November 13, 2020, Clavio, along with his co-host Ali Sotto, earned the ire of netizens after he asked an 'insensitive' question towards a woman who was a victim of Typhoon Vamco (locally named Ulysses). Vamco brought heavy flooding and left Metro Manila and several parts of Luzon in devastation on Thursday, November 12. Among those who were affected by the flood was Angela Jardin whom the two asked, a resident from Provident Village in Marikina. She and five other people were stranded on the third floor of her house during the Typhoon's landfall. The conversation earned a lot of criticism from netizens who called out the radio anchors for being insensitive towards the victim. Netizens said it seems like he blamed the victim for choosing to stay in their house. Many netizens called out Clavio and Sotto for their "privilege" as they assume that others have options to find a better shelter.

Personal life
Clavio is married with three children. He has a daughter with Sarah Balabagan.
Clavio started the Igan Foundation, whose stated mission is to help those living in poverty and diagnostic as diabetic alopecia.

Career timeline

Television

Radio

Awards and nominations
Outstanding Male News PresenterSaksi (1995) -Nominee
Outstanding Celebrity Talk Program Host (2010)-Nominee
Awardee, UST AB Gantimpala Awards (2012)

See also
GMA News and Public Affairs
DZBB-AM

References

1965 births
Living people
Filipino radio journalists
Filipino television news anchors
GMA Network personalities
GMA Integrated News and Public Affairs people
University of Santo Tomas alumni
People from Tondo, Manila
Filipino television talk show hosts